The Plaxton Cheetah is a minibus/midibus body manufactured by Plaxton in Wigan, England. Between 1997 and 2014 it was mounted on Mercedes-Benz Vario chassis.

In April 2015, the Cheetah XL was launched on the Mercedes-Benz Atego chassis. Plaxton decided to end Cheetah XL production in 2019 due to poor sales.

Gallery

References

External links

Flick gallery
Cheetah XL Brochure Plaxton

Cheetah
Vehicles introduced in 1997
Buses of the United Kingdom
Minibuses
Midibuses